St Stephen's Church, Norwich is a Grade I listed parish church in the Church of England in Norwich.

History

The church dates from the 14th century. The tower was remodelled in 1601. Richard Caister was Vicar from 1402 to his death in 1420, during which time he was the priest-confessor to the mystic Margery Kempe. After his death, his burial place became a pilgrimage site.

Stained glass

The church contains a jumble of stained glass from Mariawald Abbey near Heimbach in Germany.

Organ

The church has an organ dating from 1869 which was installed by T. C. Lewis, but which has had several restorations by Hill, Norman and Beard. A specification of the organ can be found on the National Pipe Organ Register.

References

Saint Stephen
14th-century church buildings in England
Grade I listed churches in Norfolk